This is a summary of the electoral history of Norman Kirk, Prime Minister of New Zealand (1972–74), Leader of the Labour Party (1965–74), Member of Parliament for Lyttelton (1957–69) and later Sydenham (1969–74).

Parliamentary elections

1954 election

1957 election

1960 election

1963 election

1966 election

1969 election

1972 election

Local elections

1953 Kaiapoi mayoral election

1956 Kaiapoi mayoral election

Leadership elections

1963 Deputy-leadership election

1965 Leadership election

Party elections

1964 Party Conference

Notes

References

Kirk, Norman